Calvary Day School is an Independent Christian school located in Savannah, Georgia, United States. It is associated with the Association of Christian Schools International (ACSI).

References

External links

1961 establishments in Georgia (U.S. state)
Christian schools in Georgia (U.S. state)
Educational institutions established in 1961
Private high schools in Georgia (U.S. state)
Private middle schools in Georgia (U.S. state)
Private elementary schools in Georgia (U.S. state)
Schools in Savannah, Georgia
Segregation academies in Georgia